DZOR (1422 AM) is a defunct radio station owned and operated by Zambales Broadcasting and Development Corporation. The station's studio was located along Rizal Ave., Olongapo, near the Bajac-Bajac Bridge.

References

Radio stations in Olongapo
News and talk radio stations in the Philippines
Defunct radio stations in the Philippines